The National East Indies monument 1945–1962 in Roermond, the Netherlands commemorates more than 6200 Dutch servicemen who died in either the former Dutch East Indies or New Guinea. The monument is located in the National Remembrance Park Roermond (Dutch: Nationaal Herdenkingspark Roermond), which also has monuments dedicated to the civilians who died during that period, as well as Dutch servicemen who died in other missions since the start of the Korean War.

Dutch culture
Monuments and memorials in the Netherlands
Buildings and structures in Roermond